Álava may refer to:
 Álava (Spanish Congress Electoral District)
 Álava (province)
People
 Miguel Ricardo de Álava y Esquivel
 Ignacio Maria de Álava y Sáenz de Navarrete